Mount Tongariro is a compound volcano in the Taupō Volcanic Zone of the North Island of New Zealand.

Geology
Mount Tongariro is part of the Tongariro volcanic centre, which consists of four massifs made of andesite: Tongariro, Kakaramea-Tihia Massif, Pihanga,
and Ruapehu at the southern end of the North Island Volcanic Plateau. Tongariro is composed of layers of both lava and tephra and the eruptions that built the current stratovolcano commenced about 275,000 years ago.

Tongariro consists of at least 12 cones. Ngauruhoe, while often regarded as a separate mountain, is geologically a cone of Tongariro. It is also the most active vent, having erupted more than 70 times since 1839, the last episode in 1973 to 1975.

Activity has also been recorded at other vents in recent history. Te Māri Craters erupted in 2012, for the first time since 1897. Red Crater last erupted ash in 1926 and contains active fumaroles. There are many explosion craters on the massif; water has filled some of these to form the Blue Lake and the Emerald Lakes.

The high altitude and severe alpine climate between March and October cause snowfall in the winter (there are commercial ski-fields at neighbouring Mount Ruapehu) and rain can freeze, causing verglas; in contrast in the mid to late summer, the mountains can be bare apart from remnant patches of snow in south-facing gullies. Unlike nearby Mt. Ruapehu, no glaciers exist on Tongariro today. However, geomorphological evidence in the form of moraines and cirques indicates the former presence of mountain glaciers. Dating of moraines on western Tongariro show that valley glaciers were present at several times during the last glacial cycle, before melting away at the end of the Last Glacial Maximum approximately 18,000 years ago.

History
Mount Tongariro is in the Tongariro National Park, New Zealand's first national park and one of the earliest in the world. It was set aside (literally "made sacred") in 1887 by Te Heuheu Tukino IV (Horonuku), paramount chief of the Māori Ngati Tuwharetoa iwi and made a national park in order to preserve its natural beauty. The park also includes the peaks of Ngauruhoe and Ruapehu, both of which lie to the southwest of Tongariro. The national park is a dual World Heritage Site for its outstanding natural and intangible cultural values.

The Tongariro Alpine Crossing hiking route passes between Tongariro and Ngauruhoe.

Mount Tongariro and its surroundings are also one of the several locations which Peter Jackson chose to shoot The Lord of the Rings film trilogy.

Eruptive history

The oldest recorded volcanism in the area was at 933,000 ± 46,000 years ago at Hauhungatahi, northwest of Ruapehu. There is then a gap in identified materials until a small lava inlier on the western side of Tongariro that has been dated at 512,000 ± 59,000 years ago and is essentially buried by more recent activity. The  cone and  ring-plain of the complex has multiple eruptive centres aligned with the Taupō volcanic rift and bounded by the Waihi and Poutu fault zones. The formation of these began about 304,000 years ago in the Tama lakes area and definitely was established by 230,000 years ago. The eruptive centres extend from the Te Maari craters in the northeast to the Tama Lakes in the southwest and include the more classic cone of Mount Ngauruhoe which like North Crater, another symmetrical but smaller cone, required the absence of ice after the last ice age to form. Tongariro displays evidence for extensive Quaternary glaciation in the form of moraines and lava-ice interaction textures. However Pukeonake is off this axis, approximately 6 km west of the linear vent zone, but is considered to be a satellite vent. There was an intense period of large explosive eruptions around 11,000 years ago from multiple vents between Tongariro and Ruapehu (the Pahoka-Mangamate sequence).

2012 Te Māri eruptions

After a period of volcanic unrest that had resulted in an increase in alert level on 20 July 2012, at 11:50 pm (NZST, UTC+12) on 6 August 2012, Mt Tongariro had what was initially believed to be a hydrothermal eruption after this increased activity. The eruption occurred at the Te Māri Craters, which had not had a major ash eruption since 1897 and had been dormant since September 1899.

The ash cloud travelled  in four hours. Ash and the smell of sulphur was reported in Napier and Hastings. The smell of sulphur was also reported in Wellington, Nelson and Blenheim.

The airspace within a  radius of the mountain was closed after the eruption, but later reopened to visual flights only. Air New Zealand cancelled some flights in and out of Rotorua, Taupō, Gisborne, Napier, Wanganui and Palmerston North due to the risk of volcanic ash clogging the engines on their aircraft serving those airports.

There was no official evacuation but 24 people living along State Highway 46 fled their homes for fear of being isolated.

Mount Tongariro erupted again at 1:20 pm on 21 November, ejecting an ash cloud 4000 metres into the air. Flights in the area were cancelled, as were several the following morning. Geologists had no warning before the eruption, saying it wasn't linked to warnings the week before of elevated activity at nearby Mount Ruapehu.

See also
List of mountains of New Zealand by height
Volcanism of New Zealand
List of volcanoes in New Zealand
Tongariro Northern Circuit

References

Further reading
Hill, H. (1893) The Volcanic Outburst at Te Māri, Tongariro, in November, 1892., Transactions of the New Zealand Institute, 26, 388–391.

External links

Tongariro National Park at the Department of Conservation
Tongariro Alpine Crossing at the Department of Conservation
Tongariro Alpine Crossing photos at Virtual Oceania

Active volcanoes
Complex volcanoes
Volcanic crater lakes
Mountains of Waikato
Stratovolcanoes of New Zealand
Tongariro Volcanic Centre
VEI-5 volcanoes
Mount Tongariro
Ruapehu District
Taupō Volcanic Zone
Pleistocene stratovolcanoes
Holocene stratovolcanoes